Aujac is the acronym of "Associació d'Usuaris de Java de Catalunya", non-profit association that intended to group all users of the Java language created by James Gosling at Sun MicroSystems.

Born 

Aujac (Associació d'Usuaris de Java de Catalunya) born with the initial proposal to bring near the new information technologies to the people. An effort made through one of the most active Java Users Groups in Europe.

AUJAC starts to forge as an idea during the celebration of a Java course and after the initial creation of the JUG of Sabadell by Jordi Pujol Ulied, founder and president of the Aujac, in April of year 2000.

The interest was very high and soon summoned a first meeting for establishing the statutes and the first Board of Directors.

The meetings occurs often and with an important collective effort that it is it could make patent in the several encounters that they were made in the current headquarters of the entity, in Sabadell.

The members founding of AUJAC was:

Jordi Pujol Ulied (president)
Xavier Pi i Palomés (underpresident)
Marc Munill i Bernandich (secretary)
Josep Folch i Serra (treasurer)
German Munuera Pubill (vowel)
Mònica Rayo Moragon (vowel)
Albert Soler i Crosas (vowel)
Pere Brugue i Pujol

At the end of year 2000, was constituted and recognized by the Generalitat de Catalunya, and being inscribed in the "Registre General d'Entitats Jurídiques" with number of inscription: 23889 / B

On the other hand, the AUJAC was recognized by Sun MicroSystems as official JUG of Catalonia.

And in year 2003 the AUJAC becomes the most important 16é JUG of the world: Top25 JUG Program.

Targets 

According to the num article. 2 of its statutes:

The purposes of the association:

1. - To group all the users of the Java programming language in Catalonia as well as other aspects that have relation with this language.

2. - The association is in itself an organic representation of the JUG (Java Users Group) in Catalonia, started by the company creative of the language, Sun MicroSystems, in the promotion of users associations (JUGS) indicating that it declares as a non-profit association and therefore there is not commercial connection with the company and just sustains bonds of users associationism.

3. - To foster and to promote Catalan information society, in all the possible areas. The Catalan was the expression and work language of the association.

President and board of directors 

Along its existence, the Aujac is it composed of several boards of directors.

The members who compose the Board of Directors, as they marked the statutes, were chosen every two years in the General Assembly of Members, and the former members can be presented to the charge without any harm again.
During the first biennium of existence of the AUJAC (2000-2002) the Board of Directors has been composed by the following persons:

President: Jordi Pujol Ulied
SotsPresident: Xavier Pi Palomes
Treasurer: Josep Folch i Serra
Secretary: Marc Munill Bernándich
Vowels:
German Munuera Pubill
Ignasi Pérez Valls
Mònica Rayo Morajón
Albert Soler Crosas

In the 2002 elections, the Board of Directors for the period 2002-2004 was:

President: Jordi Pujol Ulied
SotsPresident: Josep Ros Navarro
Treasurer: Josep Folch i Serra
Secretary: Mònica Rodríguez Gili
Vowels:
Mònica Rayo Moragón
David Villegas Terrín
Aleix Torres Casas

In the periode 2004–2006, the board of directors comes off composed in the following way:

President: Jordi Pujol Ulied
SotsPresident: Aleix Torres Casas
Treasurer: Jordi Marques del Aguila
Secretary: Maiol Xercavins i Simó
Vowels:
David Villegas Terrín
Josep Folch Serra
Inma Camacho Arellano

Main activities 

The main activities of the Aujac it is they centered in three main axes: formation, broadcast and collaboration projects.

Formation 

In the program of formation it is intended to:

Facilitate the technology access to all the persons concerned to the Java technologies.
Establish a shared plan of formation in all the Catalan area, which they are governed by the same criterion of evaluation and formation, with a unitary program of courses.

The plan had a remarkable success, and the Barcelona Football club, "Fundación Once" and the University Autonòma of Barcelona (UAB) was one of their customers.

The plan of formation also allowed the creation of a Java Master Course at the "Fundació Indústries de la Informació", entity promoted by Mr. Antoni Farrés :ca:Antoni Farrés i Sabater.

Otherwise, it is also they imparted several courses in the EUIS, Escola Universitària d'Informàtica de Sabadell, ascribed to the UAB.

Diffuse 

With respect to the diffusion of the Java technology, Aujac organized the "Sun Tech Day" in Sabadell 2004, and three editions of the "Jornades Java Catalanes", and became the first non-enterprise group to organize an event of this kind in Spain, copied afterwards by JavaHispano, which made two editions of a similar event, after having attended the first as a viewer.

As explained in the definition of the "Jornades Java Catalanes" these were:

The "Jornades Java Catalanes" are an event focused to diffuse the Java technology and other similar technologies to the Catalan community. It is an event open to everybody, focused to several sectors of the Catalan community: university, enterprise, final users and general public.

The goal of the "Jornades Java Catalanes" is to visit all Catalan universities along the several editions, located in Catalonia, Valencia, Balearic Islands and the North Catalonia, through the hand of technological companies in this area.

An annual periodicity is established in the event.

The language of expression and work of "Jornades Java Catalanes" is, by default, the Catalan. Excluding in those activities in which they have to be made, by non-catalan resident of the persons who develop them, in the languages of expression of the same ones.

The area of performance and divulging of the "Java conference C0atalanes" they are all those regions of Catalan speech.

The "Jornades Java Catalanes" base their diffusion area on three predominant areas: enterprise, university and society.

Aujac was pioneer in the Spanish state, the year 2003, in being the first non-profit organization that achieved to gather in a same event about Java, the university world, the enterprise sector and the general society, acting as link of union among them.

This joint position of initiative and leadership between Aujac and all the Catalan universities, makes the present model have been adopted by other similar entities all over the Spanish state when carrying out similar events certifying the success of the same ones.

First "Jornades Java Catalanes" 

The first "Jornades Java Catalanes" was celebrated at the ETSE, "Escola Técnica Superior d'Enginyeria" from the "Universitat Autonòma de Barcelona", on 25 February 2003.

The sponsors of this event were:

Bea Systems
Sun MicroSystems

and the collaborator companies:

Steria
Cast-Info
Borland

We can find press releases in Vilaweb:

Second "Jornades Java Catalanes" 

The second "Jornades Java Catalanes" was celebrated at the Universitat Internacional de Catalunya, the 15th and 16 April in 2004.

The sponsors of this event were:

Bea Systems
Caixa Penedès
Cast-Info
Data.ti
IBM
Oracle Corporation
MSS
Sun MicroSystems

The participant companies were::

da.vinci

And the collaborator companies were:

CBA Computers, S.L.
Filnet

They receive support from:

Escola Tècnica Superior d'Enginyeria of UAB University
ATI
SOFTCATALÀ
PuntBarra

Some press notes can be consulted to several newspapers like:

Third "Jornades Java Catalanes" 

 The second "Jornades Java Catalanes" was celebrated at the "Sala de Congressos del Parc d'Innovació La Salle", located at the university campus of the given university, in 14th and 15 April in 2005.

The sponsors of this event were:

Bea Systems
Borland
Caixa Penedès
Data.ti
Oracle Corporation
Steria
Sun MicroSystems

The participant companies were::

Ilog
MSS
Quest Software

They receive support from:

CBA Computers, S.L.
Filnet

You can see several press notes on a different sources:

- Press note at COEIC:

- Press note at LaFarga.cat

Sun Tech Day in Sabadell 

Belong of the collaboration among the EUIS and AUJAC, a Sun Tech Day was organized by them.

Angela Caicedo, Technology Evangelist of Sun Microsystems, was the speaker of the presentation of the Java2 Standard Edition 5.0 (Tiger).

That explained the new features and the technical aspects of this last version of the Java platform.

Also it made demonstrations of how to develop applications helping for us of the new possibilities.

The session took place on the 20th of December 2004 from 17.30 to 20.00 hours. The assistants received original CDs of Sun and a T-shirt, and raffled books and other gifts.

Almost 100 persons attended the act.

During the act, AUJAC gives a commemorative diploma of gratitude to Mr. Reginald Hutcherson (boss of the Java Technology Evangelist).

You can you find references of this event in the web page of the EUIS:

Collaboration projects 

The Aujac promotes several collaboration projects with entities from all over the territory. Basicament spread on two main axes: those activities that offered a series of services to the community, and of another the impulse of the technology in educational areas.

It is necessary to highlight that in the area of the teaching, the Aujac signs with the UAB University, several agreements of collaboration among those that highlight the teaching courses as well as the direction of career projects under the direction of Jordi Pujol Ulied, president of Aujac.

It is necessary to highlight that was signed two final university projects:

 "LABOR": Employment Exchange, by Anna Torres Ribas, that received the qualification of: 10 over 10.
 "hosting.aujac.org", by Aleix Torres Casas, that received the qualification of: 9.75 over 10, with Honour mark.

Honour members 

Aujac gives every April, the Honour Member to a personality or Catalan entity.

With this distinction they want to recognize those personalities or entities that with their disposition, implication, dedication and effort, have contributed to the growth and development of the technology society in our country.

2001 Honour Member

In 2001, Mr. was elected as Honour Member of Aujac.

Political icon of the democratic movement in the seventies in Sabadell, was the first democratic mayor of the quoted population, and one of the big social instigators of the post Franco's regime.

Instigator on the other hand, of projects of the technology society, like the creation of the "Fundació Indústries de la Informació", with headquarters in Sabadell, or instigator of the projects of electronic administrations in Catalonia.

It is necessary to highlight that the open speech of the Aujac social presentation was offered by him in the headquarters of the ancient F2I, "Fundació Indústries de la Informació", in Sabadell, that today is the Chamber of Commerce of Sabadell.

2002 Honour Member

Joan Daví i Ferrer, became Member of Honor Aujac the year 2002.

Joan Daví i Ferrer, from Terrassa, director of projects in "Caixa Terrassa", led in the bank world an opening towards the non-proprietary systems that it led to conceiving unedited bank architectures until then it, and who broke outlines, and especially with the traditional systems established in the financial environments.

Nowadays, its designs in computer architectures devoted to the bank services are a referent.

For all of this reasons, Aujac considered to distinguish it with the Honour member.

2003 Honour Member

 Dr. Jordi Roig de Zarate, professor of the IT Department of the UAB University. It was Director of the EUIS in Sabadell, during period 2000–2002.

Constant fighter towards the own difficulties has always known how to win the battle of the adversities, demonstrating that many times, there are not barriers that can be through with effort, dedication and constancy.

Their spirit of improvement, together with its professional profile, they act as him a person who has known how to transmit its pupils the illusion about the new technologies.

Him for this qualities and many others, that Dr. Jordi Roig de Zarate was called "Honour Member" in year 2003.

2004 Honour Member

The Mr. Eduard Elias (right), dean of the "Col.legi Official d'Enginyeria en Informàtica de Catalunya", was elected "2004 Honour Member".
Promoter and instigator of the Catalan Association of Engineers in Computer Science (ACEI), he was some of the craftsmen of the creation of the Official School of Engineering in Computer Science of Catalonia.

This Honour Member recognizes years of dedication of the technology association and the effort to attain a regularization of the profession.

His forces and dedication has allowed the creation of the "Col.legi Official d'Enginyeria en Informàtica de Catalunya ". Arrange of this, Aujac want to give him this honour member, in 16 of April 2004, in the UNICA University.

2005 Honour Member

Associació per a Joves TEB, receives on 15 April 2005, during the closing ceremony of "III Jornades Java Catalanes", the "2005 Honour Member".

With this distinction it is wants to recognize the effort and dedication carried out, for this entity, that have demonstrated its contribution to the growth and development of information society in zones where the youngsters live in situations of exclusion, and where the new technologies could not be another barrier.

It is from this project, and other important project like Xarxa-Òmnia, RavalNet and a long list of projects that they have acted how authentic dynamic social agents and of bridges of cohesion there where bags of social exclusion could be produced.

Dissolution 

According to the agreements taken in the last General Assembly of Members, on Tuesday, 24 October 2006 at 20:00 hours, was approved by over ot the two-thirds parts of the votes, the dissolution of the association.

The reasons that brought to the dissolution were mainly two, as they were explained at the meeting:

The little support on the part of the implied companies, and especially of the matrix company, Sun MicroSystems, which finally cut the capital funding of the entity.
On the other hand, the problem of the technological voluntarism, in Catalonia, a concept that has just not been understood by the society.
 The people associate the technology with affairs of materialist look, where always to take out a benefit and this entails that there are few people willing to collaborate if there is not an economic incentive a lot.
And on "collaborating", we understand in an active and constant contribution way.
The technological voluntarism must be to grow and to be something more than to participate in the development of a software or to participate in the net without going out from home.

This close a cycle where AUJAC was the most important non-enterprise entity that promotes the diffusion of Java.

References 

Java (programming language)
Computer clubs in Spain
Organisations based in Catalonia